Dare is a 2009 American romantic drama film directed by Adam Salky and written by David Brind. The film is based on Salky's 2005 short film which was met with acclaim at film festivals. The feature-length version, which premiered at the Sundance Film Festival, stars Emmy Rossum in a story about how "three very different teenagers discover that, even in the safe world of a suburban prep school, no one is who she or he appears to be." The film has been described as a cross between Pretty in Pink and Cruel Intentions.

Cast

Production
In 2003, David Brind and Adam Salky were classmates in the Graduate Film Program at Columbia University in New York. Their first-year assignment was to pair up to create an 8–12 minute short film—the caveat being that one could not direct one's own script. Adam took his own personal dare when he went out of his comfort zone to take on David's story of two very different high school boys who come unexpectedly together one night in a confluence of champagne, a swimming pool and adolescent bravado. The short film starred Michael Cassidy as Johnny and Adam Fleming as Ben and took a successful run in many film festivals in 2005.

Reception
, the film holds a 57% approval rating on Rotten Tomatoes, based on 21 reviews with an average rating of 5.26/10.

Dare was listed as one of the "best films of 2009" in Newsday by movie critic Rafer Guzman. He wrote, "This little-seen movie stars Ashley Springer, Emmy Rossum and Zach Gilford - all delivering top-notch performances - as three high-schoolers whose wobbly psyches collide. One of the smartest and most honest teen movies in years."

A.O. Scott of The New York Times wrote, "Dare, written by David Brind, directed by Adam Salky and based on their short film of the same title, stakes out familiar territory and, true to its name, strikes out in some risky new directions. This high school semi-romance, which blends comic and tearful moods, is at once more provocative and more contemplative than most of its big-screen counterparts."

James Greenberg of The Hollywood Reporter wrote, "Dare, a smart and well-observed entry in the genre, is a cut above the usual hijinks. What elevates Dare above the usual high school fare is the quality of the writing by David Brind, crisp direction by Adam Salky and a uniformly attractive and compelling cast led by the delightful Emmy Rossum"

Gerrick Kennedy of the Los Angeles Times wrote, "With its dark, hyper-sexualization of teens, it offers an engrossing if not soap opera-esque tale of self-discovery."

Stina Chyn of Film Threat gave Dare four stars, writing, "What might otherwise be an exercise in ordinary adolescent stories turns powerfully intimate through the wonderful performances that Salky coaxes out from the cast."

Owen Gleiberman of Entertainment Weekly wrote, "Dare, a sweetly sexed-up high school triangle movie, is like a John Hughes comedy trying to pass itself off as transgressive" and gave it a C+ rating.

Emmy Rossum won the Young Hollywood Award at the Savannah Film Festival, because of her acting performance in Dare.

Sequel
In 2017, David Brind and Adam Salky started a Kickstarter campaign for a sequel to the original short film, with Cassidy and Fleming reprising their roles. Launching the campaign in August, asking for $30,000, by September the film had been backed by over 200 backers and resulted in a total funding of approximately $32,000. Filming began on December 22, 2017 in Los Angeles, with the film wrapping on December 26, 2017.

References

External links
 
 

2009 films
2009 independent films
2009 LGBT-related films
2009 romantic drama films
2000s teen drama films
2000s teen romance films
American independent films
American romantic drama films
American teen drama films
American teen romance films
Features based on short films
Films set in Philadelphia
Gay-related films
Male bisexuality in film
2000s English-language films
Films directed by Adam Salky
2000s American films